Polde Bibič (3 February 1933 – 13 July 2012) was a Slovenian stage and film actor, a writer, and an academic professor, best known for his role in the film Flowers in Autumn and his work in theater, Bibič was a recipient of several top awards in the field of arts in Slovenia.

Life
Bibič was born in Maribor. He attended the secondary school in the town and then studied stage plays in Ljubljana under Vida Juvan. He finished his studies in 1961. He first appeared in the film Moments of Decision (Trenutki odločitve; 1955), directed by František Čap. Later, he worked in the Ljubljana Drama Theatre, where he was also the director from 1977 until 1981. He was a professor of theatre at the Ljubljana Academy of Theatre, Radio, Film and Television. He died aged 79 in Ljubljana.

Work
Bibič played a number of roles in many films that were well received in Slovenia: Don't Cry, Peter (1964), On Wings of Paper (1968), Kekec's Tricks (1968), Flowers in Autumn (1973), The Widowhood of Karolina Žašler (1976), Heritage (1986), Primož Trubar (1985), and My Dad, The Socialist Kulak (1987). Many of these were directed by Matjaž Klopčič. He also performed in television and radio drama.

Altogether, he played over 150 theatre and over 30 film roles. He wrote seven autobiographical books.
Bibič was a member of the ensemble of the Ljubljana National Drama Theatre, where he remained active after his retirement in 1995 as well. He often played in Ljubljana City Theatre, Slovene theatre in Trieste, and experimental theatres.

Aside from acting, Bibič was also active in politics. After the Slovenian declaration of independence, he served two terms as a member of the National Council. However, as he later stated, he regretted his involvement with politics, as "he was not able to change anything".

Awards and recognitions
For his work, he was awarded the Župančič Award (1974), the award for cultural achievements in the city of Ljubljana, the Prešeren Award (1977 and 1985), the highest Slovenian award in the field of culture, the Borštnik Ring (1984), the highest Slovenian award for actors, the Silver Order of Freedom of Republic of Slovenia (1996), and the Sterija Prize in Novi Sad in 1984.

At his death, Bibič was described by other Slovenian actors and writers as a giant, the prince of the theatre, and a legendary acting folk character. A deep admiration of him and appreciation of his work was also expressed by the President of Slovenia Danilo Türk and the Prime Minister Janez Janša.

On 3 February 2013, Google Doodle celebrated Polde Bibič’s 80th Birthday.

Filmography

Film

Television

References

External links
 
Polde Bibič at film-center.si

1933 births
2012 deaths
Slovenian male film actors
Slovenian male stage actors
Slovenian writers
Prešeren Award laureates
Actors from Maribor
Recipients of the Order of Freedom of the Republic of Slovenia
University of Ljubljana alumni
Academic staff of the University of Ljubljana
20th-century Slovenian male actors
21st-century Slovenian male actors
Members of the National Council (Slovenia)